, known outside Japan as Catnapped!, is a 1995 Japanese anime feature film, directed, created and written by Takashi Nakamura, who was also its character designer. The animation was produced by Triangle Staff. The theme song of the film was performed by Mayumi Iizuka.

Plot

For a whole week, Toriyasu and his little sister, Meeko, have been missing their pet dog, Papadoll. Toriyasu thinks he ran off, but Meeko claims it was an alien abduction. Though Toriyasu mocks Meeko for her over-imaginative ways, she isn't far off from the truth. On the way to school, Meeko sees what looks like a cat in clothes slipping into the shadows. Later that evening, three anthropomorphic feline scientists, Henoji, Suttoboke and HoiHoi go into Toriyasu and Meeko's room intending to take Toriyasu with them on a trip. Instead they end up waking and taking Meeko as well. She accompanies them in their vehicle (a balloon that resembles a cheshire cat) with a tired Toriyasu.

The cats soon reach their own world: Banipal Witt, a world of incredibly strange variety. Suddenly, they run into the Sleeping Cat, the very support of Banipal Witt. If the Sleeping Cat wakes, their world would be destroyed. The two children soon find that Banipal Witt is far different than their home: Three minutes in the human world is one day in Banipal Witt and the cats are only anthropomorphic in Banipal Witt (Henoji having remarked that, because of the human world, their life expectancy has decreased). Both Toriyasu and Meeko are turned into anthropomorphic kittens by the sun of Banipal Witt (which is magical in nature) as soon as they set foot on Banipal Witt.

Soon, the kids meet the leader of a resistance: Master Sandada, a powerful wizard. Sadly, in the absence of the trio sent to find Toriyasu and Meeko, Sandada has fallen victim to a curse from Lady Buburina, a dictator-like princess that has gone insane and (due to an enchantment) turns anyone she touches into a balloon. Sandada was unable to protect himself, because his last line of defense- a mystic glove called the Sorcerer's Arm -was stolen by DohDoh, his apprentice that had fallen to insanity due to a curse. Master Sandada explains that he brought Toriyasu here to catch Papadoll, who has supposedly been wreaking havoc across Banipal Witt.

ChuChu, DohDoh's younger sister and the strongest fighter for the resistance, comes to warn that Papadoll has been abducting more villagers and is approaching their location fast. Papadoll soon arrives and the kids can't believe their eyes: Their dog has been turned into a giant, flying monster. DohDoh leaves Sandada with an ultimatum from Buburina: If Sandada doesn't surrender before the next sunrise, great disaster shall befall Banipal Witt. Meeko manages to get Papadoll to calm down, but an interruption from Toriyasu sends Papadoll into a fit of rage. In the confusion, Meeko is taken hostage and things begin to look grim.

Some time later, Sandada explains that when a creature from another world is touched by the sun twice, they become what Papadoll has become. Expectedly, Toriyasu freaks out, demanding to go home, but the others manage to reason with him because he needs to save his sister.

Meanwhile, at the palace, the prisoners (including Meeko) attempt to break out. Meeko comes close, but ends up trapped near the throne room. Listening in on a conversation between Buburina and her parents, she finds out that Buburina's power is supposed to be a punishment that was cast by a wizard who sought revenge against her for sending his daughter to her death (even though Buburina claimed that it wasn't her fault).

Back at Sandada's manor, Toriyasu (along with Henoji, Suttoboke, HoiHoi and ChuChu) are sent by Sandada to Buburina's palace to knock Papadoll out with a pill that contains sleeping powder that Sandada claims would make an animal like Papadoll sleep for a week and Papadoll's chain. Before leaving, Sandada says that only Toriyasu has the power to turn Papadoll back to normal.

Later that night, Buburina calls an assembly to inform her prisoners of their fate. She tells her prisoners of her plan to create a giant mouse that would be used to wake the Sleeping Cat should anyone rebel against her, sending Banipal Witt into turmoil. Meeko, however, ridicules Buburina's plan, claiming that Papadoll wouldn't do that. Meeko demands the return of Papadoll and insults the princess by calling her a witch. Buburina, having been upset by Meeko's insult, tries to turn her into a balloon and pop her, but finds she cannot (the curse only affects people from Banipal Witt). Realizing that Meeko is a human, Buburina plans to make Meeko her new monster slave once the sun rises. She then turns all her prisoners into balloons (so that she can finish her mouse balloon) and throws Meeko inside also.

Under cover of night, Toriyasu and the others prepare to sneak into the castle to free Papadoll and save Meeko. Unfortunately, the plan goes awry, as Toriyasu accidentally wakes Buburina up when the rope he is on slips, setting off alarms all over the castle. Toriyasu and ChuChu make an escape, while Suttoboke (who broke off from the group because he got Meeko's scent) runs into DohDoh in an attempt to save Meeko.

Quickly, Toriyasu and ChuChu (after having a bonding moment) regroup in time to see Suttoboke and Meeko release the mouse balloon. With Buburina's plan falling apart at the seams, DohDoh goes to try to kill Meeko and Suttoboke, while Toriyasu and ChuChu go to try to get Papadoll under control and stop Buburina.

In the ensuing air battle, Toriyasu suffers through a temporary depression caused by DohDoh's taunting (having remembered a time when he beat Papadoll to release some built-up anger that had been caused by teasing from three neighborhood bullies). DohDoh, however, is dealt a hard fate by karma, as he breaks the mouse balloon when he gets too close to the castle and loses his hold on the Sorcerer's Arm. Toriyasu, remembering what Master Sandada had said before he left, regains faith in himself and tries to take Papadoll back. Buburina, however, refuses to give back Papadoll and nearly makes Toriyasu fall to his death after Buburina tears Papadoll's collar off.

During his fall, Papadoll finally remembers Toriyasu (having ignored Buburina's orders to eat Toriyasu) and Toriyasu remembers how much Papadoll means to him (shown in flashback form). Toriyasu then goes insane for only a few seconds before regaining composure after landing on one of Buburina's victims. Using the victim as a means of transportation (even though the said victim tries to protest as best he can to this idea), he reaches Papadoll (avoiding seeking missiles fired by Buburina) and regains control of him with ChuChu's help. However, the signal tower (the enormous flare gun-like device that lights Banipal Witt's sun every morning) goes off, leaving Toriyasu and the others only a few seconds to save Meeko.

Quickly, they rescue Meeko and make it home. Buburina and DohDoh both end up with miserable fates: Buburina is left sinking into a small lake, and DohDoh tangled in what remains of the mouse balloon.

Toriyasu and Meeko return to normal (no longer transformed by Banipal Witt's sun), Toriyasu and ChuChu develop a relationship and the cats say that the two can visit any time and they can also choose to be cats again if they want. Before returning home, Meeko makes a prediction that Buburina will make a comeback.

The next morning, Toriyasu and Meeko return to a normal life. Unbeknownst to the children, Meeko is right again: The cats go to Toriyasu and Meeko's school due to some urgent business that came up only recently, leaving the movie on a cliffhanger.

Staff
Original Creator, Director, Character Designs: Takashi Nakamura
Screenplay: Takashi Nakamura, Chiaki J. Konaka
Producers: Tarō Maki, Yoshimi Asari, Hiroaki Inoue
Art Director: Shinji Kimura
Music: Shigeaki Saegusa
Sound Director: Shigeharu Shiba
Production: Triangle Staff
Distribution: T&K Telefilm

Sources:

Cast
The actors are listed original voice actor first, English voice actor second.

Hiroaki Hori/Dorothy Elias Fahn as Toriyasu: One of the main characters and the primary protagonist of the movie. He is the older brother of Meeko. When first brought to Banipal Witt, he is freaked out by the prospect of a strange, new world that is hidden from sight, but he eventually warms up to the people of Banipal Witt and makes a few friends along the way (most notably ChuChu, who seems to be his love interest by the end of the film). At first, after dealing with three neighborhood bullies and beating up Papadoll, Toriyasu was uncaring about the fact that his dog has gone missing, much to the heated frustrations of both ChuChu and Henoji. But as the film goes on, he begins to show care towards Papadoll and becomes determined to bring him back home, thus earning both ChuChu and Henoji's respect. Because he is a human, he is left unaffected by Buburina's curse.
Mirai Sasaki/Sandy Fox as Meeko: Toriyasu's little sister, and one of the main characters. She is the first to realize Papadoll's disappearance is by less-than-ordinary causes. She is kidnapped and taken to Buburina's castle as a prisoner early in the film, and is also the only prisoner not to be affected by Buburina's curse (because she is a human). She and Suttoboke are very close, Suttoboke acting as somewhat of a father figure to her. Unlike her brother, she was excited to be heading to another world.
Noriko Hidaka/Mary Elizabeth McGlynn as Buburina: One of the main characters, and the primary antagonist of the movie. She is a spoiled, rotten-to-the-core princess, who believes that everything belongs to her. When she was young, she inadvertently caused the death of a daughter to a court magician, who cursed Buburina with a spell that turns whatever living thing from Banipal Witt that she touches to be turned into a balloon. Unexpectedly, humans are left unaffected by Buburina's curse. She uses DohDoh's love for her as a weapon against him, taunting and teasing him (because he knows that if he even touches Buburina, he will end up another victim to her curse). She, apparently, has an extreme aversion towards water (as is shown near the end of the film, when her evil ways turn against her).
Mayumi Iizuka/Lia Sargent as ChuChu: One of the film's main characters and a protagonist. She is the little sister of DohDoh, and hopes he will break free of Buburina's control (though it seems unlikely this will happen). From her choice of clothes, it's apparent she is a knight or warrior of some kind. Apparently, she was looking forward to seeing a human (for reasons unknown), but is less than happy (or sassy at the very least) when Toriyasu shows up and begins to act like a jerk, leading to the two arguing a lot. However, as the film goes on, ChuChu begins to respect and (eventually) love Toriyasu after he begins to care more about Papadoll and becomes determined to bring him back home.
Masato Yamanouchi/Tom Wyner as Sandada: An elderly wizard, who is the leader of the resistance against Buburina. For most of the movie, he has been cursed by Buburina and forced to be pulled around by someone (usually Suttoboke or one of the rebel troops). His only source of protection, the Sorcerer's Arm, was stolen by DohDoh, who was his former apprentice. Near the end of the film, he regains the Sorcerer's Arm and everyone affected by Buburina's curse is restored (including himself).
Ichirō Nagai/Michael Sorich as Henoji: One of three feline scientists sent by Master Sandada to find Toriyasu. He serves as the leader of the little expedition to the human world, as well as the lookout on the Tomcat and timekeeper. He is generally pessimistic with many situations (such as Meeko wanting to come with Toriyasu to Banipal Witt). Like ChuChu, Henoji was initially frustrated and angry with Toriyasu when he began to act like a jerk (with Toryiasu even going as far as to angrily accuse the three scientists of kidnapping himself and Meeko, which angered Henoji). But then again, Henoji later begins to respect Toriyasu as he begins to show care towards Papadoll and becomes determined to bring him back home. Despite the fact he is a scientist, he is dressed very much like a nobleman.
Jōji Yanami/Simon Prescott as HoiHoi: One of three feline scientists sent by Master Sandada to find Toriyasu. Unlike Henoji, HoiHoi is cool and collected (though this doesn't mean he is always in a calm mood). He serves as the pilot on the Tomcat. Despite being a scientist, he is dressed like an actual pilot.
Sukekiyo Kameyama/Michael Forest as Suttoboke: One of three feline scientists sent by Master Sandada to find Toriyasu. He is the sensible member of the team. He shows great concern for Meeko, acting as a father figure of sorts. He shows great care towards his friends (and DohDoh, having expressed his and everyone's concern for him). He serves as a secondary pilot on the Tomcat. Despite the fact he is a scientist, he is dressed very much like a butler.
Fumihiko Tachiki as Papadoll: Toriyasu's dog. Though he and Toriyasu were once close friends, when Toriyasu unintentionally attacked Papadoll (due to a rage that was caused by the local bullies), Papadoll became unhappy living with Toriyasu. DohDoh soon came to the human world and "rescued" Papadoll, bringing him to Banipal Witt. Due to over-exposure from the sun, he mutated into a gigantic, flying dog monster. He had been in Banipal Witt for so long that he had forgotten who he really was. Only Toriyasu had the power to restore Papadoll to his former self. Papadoll was (of course) restored to his former self by the end of the movie, and once again became Toriyasu's friend. He was the only one to see Henoji, Suttoboke and HoiHoi enter Toriyasu and Meeko's bedroom.
Mitsuo Iwata/Dougary Grant as DohDoh: The former apprentice of Master Sandada and big brother of ChuChu, who was driven insane by a cursed painting of Buburina. Shortly after, he stole Master Sandada's invaluable and powerful Sorcerer's Arm and abandoned him to serve Buburina. He serves as Buburina's right-hand man. He desires Buburina's affection (due to the curse from the painting), which makes him a very dedicated minion. His cruelty towards Toriyasu, Meeko and the members of the resistance eventually comes back to turn against him, as he is ultimately tangled in the remains of the giant mouse balloon that Buburina made.

References

External links

1995 anime films
Anime with original screenplays
Geneon USA
Japanese animated films
1995 animated films
1995 films
Animated films about cats